The mandible is the lower jawbone of a vertebrate animal. Mandible may also refer to:

 Mandible (arthropod mouthpart), one of several mouthparts in arthropods
 Mandible (insect mouthpart), one of several mouthparts in insects
 Human mandible, the lower jawbone in humans
 Mandible Cirque, Antarctica

Entertainment
 Mandibles (film), a 2020 French film
 The Mandibles, a 2016 American novel
 "Mandible", a song by Odette from the 2021 album Herald

See also
 Mandibular (disambiguation)

de:Mandibel